Chakla (Persian: چکلہ) was a district-level administrative division in Indian subcontinent during the Mughal period. The chakla system was used at least in Bengal and Awadh provinces. The chakla was the major administrative division in a subah (province). It was further subdivided into parganas; each pargana consisted of several villages.

See also
 Sarkar (administrative division)

References 

Subdivisions of the Mughal Empire
Awadh
Bengal Subah
History of Uttar Pradesh
Former subdivisions of Bangladesh